806 Naval Air Squadron (806 NAS) was a fighter squadron in the Fleet Air Arm that existed from  February 1940 to December 1960 and saw active service in the Norwegian campaign, the Dunkirk evacuation and the Malta Convoys.

History

Formation
According to one source, 806 Naval Air Squadron was formed at HMS Kestrel on 1 February 1940 with Lieutenant Commander Charles Evans as the Commanding Officer and Lieutenant Desmond Vincent-Jones as the Senior Observer and using eight Blackburn Skuas and four Blackburn Rocs. However, another source gives the date and location as being 15 February at Eastleigh, possibly referring to  HMS Raven and states that the squadron did not have sufficient crews to operate its aircraft until the next group from the fighter training school had been trained.

Norwegian operations
806 NAS then saw its first action when it was moved in the beginning of May to HMS Sparrowhawk in order to finish working up and to then carry out bombing attacks on targets around Bergen in Norway. In these the squadron attacked oil facilities and ships, escorted by Coastal Command Bristol Blenheims from No. 254 Squadron RAF.

Their first such attack was carried out on 9 May upon a ship at Doksjeir jetty in Bergen Harbour that was reported potentially to be a cruiser at the time but later believed to have been a transport. Escorted by six Blenheims the eight Skuas armed each with a 500 lb semi-armour-piercing bomb attacked the harbour in conjunction with their escorts. Enemy action shot down a single Blenheim and also damaged one Blackburn Skua but its crew, Petty Officer Jopling and Naval Airman Jones, managed to bring the damaged plane back and were unharmed. A source states that Lieutenant Campbell-Horsfall was leading the raid and that it resulted in a single direct hit claimed upon a transport and another upon an oil tank within the port and that some escort vessels were strafed by the Skuas. According to Midshipman Hogg in quotes within the same source, reconnaissance photographs received on 11 May showed that the raid successfully sunk a training cruiser due to three direct hits, one forward, one amidships, one astern. Also Midshipman Hogg recalls that the Skua piloted by Sub Lieutenant Orr also returned with damage.

Another source, however, only mentions several hits being claimed upon the transport and also states that the Commanding Officer and Senior Observer led the raid and each received a Distinguished Service Cross, while Petty Officer Muskett and Petty Officer Clare both received a Distinguished Service Medal.

Another raid on 11 May was executed with an oil tank farm complex located on Askøy Island as the target. Lieutenant Commander Charles Evans led six Blackburn Skuas who were each armed with a single 250 lb semi-armour-piercing bomb and four 20 lb cooper bombs. Presumably, only six Skuas took part due to the remaining two not being serviceable due to the damage sustained during the attack on 9 May. Three Blenheims armed also with incendiary bombs escorted the Skuas. The squadrons' attack was virtually unopposed with no casualties amongst either squadron and several hits were claimed upon the oil tanks and these were later confirmed to be ablaze by reconnaissance photographs.

On 12 May another attack was made upon shipping around Bergen. In this attack the target was an enemy transport ship believed to be attempting to run through to Bergen Harbour with anti-aircraft guns intended to protect the port area. As in 11 May raid Evans led six Skuas accompanied by three Blenheims. The squadron located the ship as it was entering the fjords around Bergen with two escorting destroyers or motor torpedo boats and split into two waves they attempted to dive bomb the target however all six 500 lb semi-armour-piercing bombs missed although no casualties were received.

806 Naval Air Squadron's last attack on shipping and oil installations in the Bergen area was carried out on 16 May 1940 upon German warships reported to be within the harbour. Nine Skuas armed with a single 250 lb semi-armour-piercing bomb and four 20 lb cooper bombs were to take part in this raid and, just as with the previous attacks, the Blenheims of No. 254 Squadron RAF were to join them. However, in the event the Blenheims and Skuas failed to rendezvous and as 806 Naval Air Squadron searched on alone no warships were located in the area. Instead the Skuas attacked their secondary target of the fuel tanks at Skålevik and scored hits on these and received no casualties.

Dunkirk evacuations
After the attacks over Norway the squadron returned to HMS Kestrel but was soon moved to RAF Detling in Kent on 27–28 May in order to provide air cover for the Dunkirk evacuation and started its first patrol on 28 May.

The first patrol started poorly as the sections Blackburn Roc which was piloted by Midshipman Day with Naval Airman Jones manning its dorsal turret crashed whilst getting airborne but luckily without casualties. It got worse as the remaining two, which were both Blackburn Skuas, were then attacked by friendly fighters near Goodwin Sands. This resulted in the Skua which was crewed by Lieutenant Campbell-Horsfall and Petty Officer Clare being shot down and picked up by a nearby destroyer while the other piloted by Midshipman Hogg had managed to limp to RAF Manston damaged and Naval Airman Burton, the Telegraphist Air Gunner, killed. Lieutenant Campbell-Horsfall and Petty Officer Clare both received bullet wounds.

Another section that was sent to patrol in the afternoon on 29 May with Lieutenant Barnes and Lieutenant Vincent-Jones leading in an Blackburn Skua. Another Blackburn Skua piloted by Sub Lieutenant Ayres and a single Blackburn Roc crewed by Midshipman Day and Naval Airman Newton were the other two machines in the section's patrol. They surprised five Junkers Ju 88's that were attacking a convoy near Ostend. Both Skuas attacked above while the Roc flew directly under the enemy and with the turret firing upwards managed to destroy one Ju 88 resulting in the Blackburn Roc's sole air-to-air kill in the war. Both Skuas also managed to damage another Ju 88 which was then seen limping away with serious damage and losing height. All three aircraft landed back at RAF Detling safely.

Another patrol on 30 May in poor conditions attacked a Heinkel He 111 that was preparing to attack an transport. The enemy machine jettisoned its bombs due to the Skuas attack but was then lost in the poor visibility.

806's final patrol in the operations over Dunkirk was carried out on 2 June 1940 with Lieutenant Commander Charles Evans leading the patrol. During this, an enemy Ju 88 was seen to attack  and was attacked by the squadron but this machine disappeared into clouds in a slow spiral, possibly destroyed. Another Ju 88 was seen and attacked but this also dived and was lost in the clouds. An Avro Anson of RAF Coastal Command later reported seeing an Ju 88 return over Dunkirk with its port engine alight shortly after the time that 806 Naval Air Squadron attacked the Ju 88.

An 801 Naval Air Squadron detachment joined 806 NAS in operations during Operation Dynamo on 31 May 1940 and eventually relieved 806 Naval Air Squadron which was then to start training onto the Fairey Fulmar at HMS Kestrel.

Embarking in Illustrious and working-up in Bermuda
In June the squadron embarked in  along with 815 and 819 Naval Air Squadrons with whom they had been temporarily based  at RAF Detling for Operation Dynamo.  then left for Bermuda in order to work-up the ship's company and the embarked squadron's crews. On one flight during this work-up a Blackburn Skua from 806 Naval Air Squadron was accidentally lost. The aircraft had been sent up with an aircraft from 815 Naval Air Squadron that was piloted by Charles Lamb in order to make dummy attacks at them to work out the best defence for Swordfish from daylight fighter attack. In its second dummy attack the Swordfish was at sea level, and the Skua pilot dived down from two or three thousand feet, misjudging both aircraft altitudes and failed to recover on his dive and plunged into the sea with no survivors.

In another flight during their time in Bermuda, all three squadrons on Illustrious were flown from the deck while it was at anchor however when the time came to land an hour later the wind had disappeared. With the crash barrier down in order to use the full length of the deck all the Swordfish managed to land safely without tearing their arrestor hooks out. When it became 806 Naval Air Squadron's turn, Lieutenant Commander Charles Evans was the first to attempt to land and with the higher speed at touch down from the Blackburn Skua the arrestor hook on his aircraft was torn out from the fuselage and he had to resort to applying right rudder and slamming the nose of his aircraft into the ships island in order to prevent it continuing down the deck and falling into the water. The second aircraft to attempt to land still retained enough speed to become airborne again after it had torn its arrestor hook out and had to wait in the air while the rest of the squadron attempted to land, and was in the end instructed to find somewhere on Bermuda to make a forced landing; he chose to land on a golf course, resulting in the aircraft's wings being sheared away by trees. All the other pilots in the squadron then either repeated the commanding officer's actions on their turn to land or continued down the deck and fell into the water, except one other aircraft, which had managed to stop before falling off the deck. Although nobody was hurt from this last incident in Bermuda all the aircraft in the squadron had been damaged and instead of heading straight to the Mediterranean from Bermuda the Illustrious had to return to the Clyde, where they re-equipped with Fulmars, and the squadron was given a few weeks to get acquainted with the new aircraft.

Mediterranean
HMS Illustrious with 806 Naval Air Squadron on board (along with some Gloster Sea Gladiators adding to the Fulmars) was then sent to the Mediterranean and was engaged in combat on numerous occasions with no less than nine pilots eventually becoming aces while flying the squadrons Fulmars. During September 1940 the squadron took part in operations near Rhodes and the Dodecanese and in October covered a convoy to Malta. In November the squadron was given the Sea Gladiators which had belonged to 's fighter flight.

806 NAS remained in the Mediterranean (moving to  after Crete) until Formidable was badly bombed in May 1941.  806 then disembarked at Aboukir to fight in the Western Desert as part of Royal Navy Fighter Squadron from August 1941 to February 1942, re-equipping with RAF Hawker Hurricanes for that purpose.  On the RNFS's disbandment, 806 changed aircraft again (to 12 Fulmars) and moved to Ceylon, based at Ratmalana and fighting against the Easter Sunday Raid.

The former was disbanded in the UK when its ship was damaged in Pedestal and returned to the UK, while "B" Flight disembarked at Port Reitz Airport in East Africa in October 1942, only to be disbanded at Tanga in January 1943. The Squadron re-formed two years later, in August 1945, ready for the Far Eastern theatre, but its 12 Seafire L.IIIs had only reached Machrihanish by the time that campaign ended.

Reformation
On 2 March 1953 the squadron was recommissioned at HMS Goldcrest with the Hawker Sea Hawk, gaining the distinction of being the first front-line squadron in the Fleet Air Arm to use the type. As well as being the first to use it, they were also the last front-line Fleet Air Arm squadron to use the Sea Hawk when they relinquished the final aircraft and were finally decommissioned in December 1960.

Battle honors
Norway 1940
Dunkirk 1940
Mediterranean 1940–1941
Libya 1940–1941
Matapan 1941
Crete 1941
Diego Suarez 1942

Aircraft flown
Blackburn Skua
Blackburn Roc
Fairey Fulmar
Gloster Sea Gladiator
Hawker Hurricane
Grumman Martlet
Supermarine Seafire
Hawker Sea Hawk

Bibliography
Alan Key. The Fleet Air Arm – An Illustrated History. Scoval Publishing, 2008. 
Andrew Thomas. Royal Navy Aces of World War 2. Osprey Publishing, 2007. 
Charles Lamb. War in a Stringbag. Orion Publishing, 2009.

External links
Fleet Air Arm Archive Squadron Profile
Traces of World War 2 – FAA – No. 806 Squadron
Håkans Aviation Page – Biplane Fighter Aces – 'Jackie' Sewell
Håkans Aviation Page – Biplane Fighter Aces – Roger Nicholls

Military units and formations established in 1940
Military units and formations disestablished in 1960
800 series Fleet Air Arm squadrons